Jean-Baptiste Décoste (born 1925 in Saint-Louis-du-Sud - 1980) was a Haitian clergyman and bishop for the Roman Catholic Diocese of Hinche. He was ordained in 1952. He was appointed bishop in 1972. He died in 1980.

References 

1925 births
1980 deaths
Haitian Roman Catholic bishops
People from Sud (department)
Roman Catholic bishops of Hinche
Roman Catholic bishops of Port-au-Prince